Susan Christina "Sue" Richardson (née Hearnshaw, formerly Telfer, born 26 May 1961) is a retired British athlete who competed mainly in the long jump. She won the 1984 Olympic bronze medal in the long jump, having won the European Indoor title a few months earlier. Her long jump best of 6.83 metres in 1984, ranks her eighth on the UK all-time list.

Athletics career
Born Susan Hearnshaw in Liversedge, West Yorkshire, she competed for Great Britain at the 1984 Summer Olympics held in Los Angeles, U.S. in the long jump where she won the bronze medal. Her mother, Muriel Pletts, had competed in the first post-war Summer Olympic Games in London in 1948, finishing fourth as part of the British women's 4 x 100 metre relay team.

She represented England in the long jump event, at the 1978 Commonwealth Games in Edmonton, Alberta, Canada. Four years later she represented England again in the long jump event, at the 1982 Commonwealth Games in Brisbane, Queensland, Australia. Hearnshaw achieved her legal best in the long jump with 6.83 metres on 6 May 1984. She also jumped a wind-assisted 7.00 metres when winning the UK Championship title on 27 May 1984.

Personal life
A graduate of Loughborough University, she subsequently qualified as a Chartered Accountant.

International competitions

References

1961 births
Living people
People from Liversedge
Athletes from Yorkshire
British female long jumpers
English female long jumpers
Commonwealth Games competitors for England
Athletes (track and field) at the 1978 Commonwealth Games
Athletes (track and field) at the 1982 Commonwealth Games
Olympic athletes of Great Britain
Olympic bronze medallists for Great Britain
Athletes (track and field) at the 1980 Summer Olympics
Athletes (track and field) at the 1984 Summer Olympics
English Olympic medallists
Alumni of Loughborough University
Medalists at the 1984 Summer Olympics
Olympic bronze medalists in athletics (track and field)
Universiade medalists in athletics (track and field)
Universiade silver medalists for Great Britain
Medalists at the 1981 Summer Universiade